The 2020–21 London City Lionesses F.C. season was the club's second season in existence. The team competed in the FA Women's Championship, the second level of the women's football pyramid, as well as two domestic cup competitions: the FA Cup and the League Cup.

Prior to the start of the season, on 27 May 2020, London City Lionesses announced the appointment of Lisa Fallon as their new manager, taking over from John Bayer who had been in charge on an interim basis since 15 October 2019. Fallon stepped down for family reasons on 9 October 2020 only five games into the season. Fallon's assistant, Melissa Phillips, was initially announced as interim head coach before assuming the role permanently the following week.

Squad
.

FA Women's Championship

Results summary

Results

League table

Women's FA Cup 

As a member of the top two tiers, London City Lionesses will enter the FA Cup in the fourth round proper. Originally scheduled to take place on 31 January 2021, it was delayed due to COVID-19 restrictions.

FA Women's League Cup 

Per the revised format of the League Cup amid the coronavirus pandemic, the group stage was now limited to four teams per group. London City Lionesses were drawn as the only Championship team alongside FA WSL teams Tottenham Hotspur, Chelsea and Arsenal.

Squad statistics

Appearances 

Starting appearances are listed first, followed by substitute appearances after the + symbol where applicable.

|}

Transfers

Transfers in

Loans in

Transfers out

References

External links 
 London City Lionesses official website

London City Lionesses